Universidad del Caribe (RD) (UNICARIBE) is a university in Santo Domingo in the Dominican Republic..

Universities in the Dominican Republic
Education in Santo Domingo